Miriam Bobková-Cupáková (born March 2, 1979 in Spišská Nová Ves) is a retired Slovak sprint hurdler. At the 2007 IAAF World Championships in Osaka, Japan, Bobková set both a national record and a personal best time of 13.04 seconds, by finishing seventh in the preliminary heats of the women's 100 hurdles.

Career
Bobkova represented Slovakia at the 2008 Summer Olympics in Beijing, where she competed in the women's 100 m hurdles. She ran in the first heat against seven other competitors, including Turkey's Nevin Yanıt and Poland's Aurelia Trywiańska-Kollasch. She finished the race in last place by twenty-six hundredths of a second (0.26) behind Belarus' Katsiaryna Paplauskaya, with a time of 13.65 seconds. Bobkova, however, failed to advance into the semi-finals, as she placed thirty-seventh overall, and was ranked farther below two mandatory slots for the next round.

References

External links

NBC 2008 Olympics profile

Slovak female hurdlers
Living people
Olympic athletes of Slovakia
Athletes (track and field) at the 2008 Summer Olympics
Sportspeople from Spišská Nová Ves
1979 births